Cue is a small town in the Mid West region of Western Australia, located 620 km north-east of Perth. At the 2016 census, Cue had a population of 178. Cue is administered through the Cue Shire Council, which has its chambers in the historic Gentlemans Club building. The current president is Ross Pigdon. The Cue Parliament is held twice yearly in May and November.

Overview and history
Gold was discovered in 1892 though there is uncertainty as to who made the first find. Michael Fitzgerald and Edward Heffernan collected 260 ounces after being given a nugget by an Aboriginal known as "Governor". Tom Cue travelled to Nannine to register their claim. The townsite was gazetted in 1893 and named after Tom Cue.

In 1895 the town had 7 ten-head stamp mills operating around the town; these were the Cue Public Battery, Cue One Proprietary, Kangaroo, Lady Mary Amalgamated, Red, White and Blue, Rose of England, Reward and the Cue Victory.

The town's first water supply was a well in the centre of the main street; after an outbreak of typhoid fever, the well was capped with a rotunda built over the top. The water supply was replaced by another well dug near Lake Nallan; water was carted 20 km south to the townsite.

The town of Day Dawn, 8 km south, was established within a year; by 1900 a hospital and cemetery were established between the two towns and they had three newspapers operating. The rivalry between the towns fuelled a diverse sporting culture in the area. Cycling and horse-racing groups held regular events attracting competitors from as far away as Perth and Kalgoorlie.

Following heavy rains in 1913 the old Cue Battery Dam broke away from the force of the water pressure; the dam had only been repaired a few months earlier.

The township had its own dedicated municipality, the Municipality of Cue, from 1894 to 1912, when it amalgamated into the surrounding Cue Road District (now the Shire of Cue).

Railways 
Cue was the terminus for the Northern Railway in 1898 until the route was extended to Meekatharra almost ten years later, and was also the junction for the branch line to Big Bell. The line closed in 1978.

Population 
By around 1900 Cue was the centre of the Murchison goldfields and boasted a population of about 10,000. As World War I drew men from the goldfields into the Australian Army the townsite of Day Dawn was abandoned. After the war many of the mines did not reopen and this started the decline of Cue as a major population centre. After the Great Depression and the fall in the price of gold, by 1933 the population of Cue had dropped to fewer than 500. The current population is around 120; the major employer is Westgold but few employees actually live in the town, accessing a fly in/fly out roster. The Shire of Cue has ten employees and most other residents are self-employed as prospectors or government support workers. 
Cue was recently heritage listed as a town of significant historical value. The main street has changed little since it was first built. There are several buildings within the townsite that are icons in their own right.

Some heritage places in Cue and Day Dawn

Climate
Cue has a semi-arid climate with hot summers and mild to cool winters.

The area is prone to the occasional inundation: In 1912 the area was struck by drought, followed by flooding in 1913 when the town received  of rain over the course of a day resulting in washaways and other storm damage. In 1925 several buildings in the town collapsed following heavy rain and flood waters. The town received  of rain over the course of two days.

References

Further reading 
 "Along the Cue railway. Inspection of line with suggested improvements, visit to Georgina Siding". West Australian, 11 June 1898, p. 5

External links
 Cue

Mining towns in Western Australia
Towns in Western Australia